Studholme may refer to one of the following

People 

 Studholme (surname)
 Studholme Hodgson (1708–1798), a British field marshal during the 18th century.
 Studholme Brownrigg (1882–1943), a British admiral during the 20th century who died at sea in the North Atlantic in 1943

Places 

 Studholme, a locality in south Canterbury in New Zealand
 Studholme College, a college of the University of Otago in Dunedin, New Zealand
 Studholme, Cumbria, a hamlet in the English county of Cumbria
 Studholm Parish, New Brunswick, Canada